The Church of St. Théodule is a Roman Catholic church located in Sion in the canton of Valais, Switzerland.

Location
The church is located in the historic center of Sion, south from the Cathedral of Our Lady of Sion.

History

The first church on the site was built during the High Middle Ages on the ruins of a Roman bath.
The current building was built from 1514 to 1516 on the site of a former building. The nave was vaulted in 1644 by Adrien III of Reidmatten. The church was renovated in 1960–64.

The church was listed among the Cultural Property of National Significance.

Description
The church has a single nave and a polygonal choir. The buttresses which support the nave have niches and canopies for statues, though most have been removed. A small stair tower is built into the southern wall on the western end of the church.

See also
List of cultural property of national significance in Switzerland: Valais

References

External links

Website of the German-speaking parish of St. Theodul 

Roman Catholic churches completed in 1516
Cultural property of national significance in Valais
16th-century Roman Catholic church buildings in Switzerland